Metro Cebu is the second-largest metropolitan areas in the Philippines, and hosts a large number of high-rise buildings. As a result of the economic boom that Cebu experienced in the 1990s and 2000s (known as Ceboom), many highrise buildings have been constructed in Cebu City and its surrounding metropolitan area. Cebu Business Park (the city's central business district), Cebu I.T. Park, the area around Fuente Osmeña (commonly referred to as "Midtown Cebu") and South Road Properties (a mixed-use development on reclaimed land along Cebu South Coastal Road), are the locations of most of the skyscraper development in Metro Cebu. 

Horizons 101 (Tower 1), finished in 2015, is the tallest building in Metro Cebu the tallest in the Philippines outside Metro Manila. 

Tallest completed buildings above 100 meters tall

This may include spires and architectural details but does not include antenna masts.

Under construction and proposed buildings

This lists buildings that are either under construction or in the proposal or planning stage in Cebu above . A floor count of 30 storeys is used as the cutoff for buildings whose heights have not yet been released by its developers.

See also
List of tallest buildings in the Philippines
List of tallest buildings in Metro Manila
List of tallest buildings in Iloilo
List of tallest buildings in Cagayan de Oro
List of tallest buildings in Davao City

References

Cebu
Buildings and structures in Cebu City
Tallest buildings